The 1979 Spanish Grand Prix was a Formula One motor race held on 29 April 1979 at the Circuito Permanente del Jarama near Madrid, Spain. It was race 5 of 15 in both the 1979 World Championship of F1 Drivers and the 1979 International Cup for F1 Constructors. The 75-lap race was won by Patrick Depailler, driving a Ligier-Ford, with Lotus drivers Carlos Reutemann and Mario Andretti second and third respectively.

Qualifying

Qualifying classification

Race

Classification

Championship standings after the race

Drivers' Championship standings

Constructors' Championship standings

References

Spanish Grand Prix
Spanish Grand Prix
1979 in Spanish motorsport
Spanish Grand Prix